Fog is a surname. Notable people with the surname are as follows:

 Agner Fog, Danish anthropologist and computer scientist
 Dan Fog (1919–2000), Danish music antiquarian
 Magnus Fog (1893–1969), Danish equestrian
 Mogens Fog (1906–1990), Danish resistance fighter and physician
 Peter Schønau Fog (born 1971), Danish film director

Surnames of Danish origin